Video spectroscopy combines spectroscopic measurements with video technique. This technology has resulted from recent developments in hyperspectral imaging. A video capable imaging spectrometer can work like a camcorder and provide full frame spectral images in real-time that enables advanced (vehicle based) mobility and hand-held imaging spectroscopy. Unlike hyperspectral line scanners, a video spectrometer can spectrally capture randomly and quickly moving objects and processes. The product of a conventional hyperspectral line scanner has typically been called a hyperspectral data cube. A video spectrometer produces a spectral image data series at much higher speeds (1 ms) and frequencies (25 Hz) that is called a hyperspectral video. This technology can initiate novel solutions and challenges in spectral tracking, field spectroscopy, spectral mobile mapping, real-time spectral monitoring and many other applications.

See also 
Snapshot hyperspectral imaging
Hyperspectral imaging
Imaging spectroscopy
Hyperspectral systems

References 

C. B. Su'e, 2012: "Characterization of a hyperspectral chromotomographic imaging ground system". Thesis. Air Force Institute of Technology.
H. V. Nguyen, A. Banerjee, Ph. Burlina and J. Broadwater and R. Chellappa, 2011: "Tracking and identification via object reflectance using a hyperspectral video camera", In: R. Hammoud et al. (eds.), Machine Vision Beyond Visible Spectrum, Augmented Vision and Reality, 1, DOI: 10.1007/978-3-642-11568-4_9, Springer-Verlag Berlin Heidelberg 2011
D. B. Cavanaugh, J. M. Lorenz, N. Unwin, M. Dombrowski and P. Willson, 2009: "VNIR hypersensor camera system", Imaging Spectrometry XIV, edited by Sylvia S. Shen, Paul E. Lewis, Proc. SPIE Vol. 7457, 74570O · 2009 SPIE · CCC code: 0277-786X/09/$18 · doi: 10.1117/12.833539
W. Debski and P. Walczykowski, 2008: "Acquiring reflectance coefficients using hyperspectral video imagery", The International Archives of the Photogrammetry, Remote Sensing and Spatial Information Sciences. Vol. XXXVII. Part B7. Beijing 2008
A. Jung, M. Vohland and S. Thiele-Bruhn, 2015: "Use of a Portable Camera for Proximal Soil Sensing with Hyperspectral Image Data," Remote Sensing, 7(9): 11434-11448

Spectroscopy
Imaging